The 2017 Lithuanian Football Cup Final was the 72nd Lithuanian Football Cup final and took place on 24 September 2017 between Žalgiris and Stumbras. Stumbras qualified for the final for the first time in its history, while Žalgiris were the defending champions, having won the last six finals in the row. Stumbras won the final 1–0 after a late goal by Nasro Bouchareb, who was selected player of the match. Kaunas' side became first club to win the final from their first try after Neris Vilnius did it in 1992 and also managed to break Žalgiris domestic dominance of 14 straight titles in the last 5 years.

Stumbras also qualified for the 2018–19 UEFA Europa League first qualifying round and earned the right to play in the 2018 Lithuanian Supercup.

Route to the final

Pre-match

Awareness
Match attracted a lot of attention from the local press, as well as some from the international sources, mostly from Portugal.

Portuguese President Marcelo Rebelo de Sousa event came to visit and wish luck to Stumbras during his international trip to Lithuania.

On the other hand, most A Lyga clubs will support Žalgiris, mainly due to rules related with UEFA Europa League qualification.

Transport
Before the final Lithuanian Football Federation organized special buses for the local fans of both clubs that will allow to comfortably reach the final venue from Vilnius and Kaunas.

Trophy
On 19 September 2017, interim Lithuanian Football Federation president Vidmantas Butkevičius transferred LFF Cup trophy to Panevėžys city municipality and its mayor Rytis Mykolas Račkauskas. It'll be displayed there until the game.

Match

References 

2017
Lithuanian Football Cup Final
FK Žalgiris matches
FC Stumbras matches
Sports competitions in Panevėžys
September 2017 sports events in Europe
21st century in Panevėžys